Richard Sandford was a Royal Navy officer.

Richard Sandford may also refer to:

Sir Richard Sandford, 2nd Baronet (died 1675) of the Sandford baronets
Sir Richard Sandford, 3rd Baronet (1675–1723), MP
Richard Sandford, character in Alias John Preston